Thun District was one of the 25 administrative districts in the canton of Bern, Switzerland. Its capital was the municipality of Thun. The district had an area of 285 km2 and consists of 27 municipalities:

References

Former districts of the canton of Bern